The 2000–01 Idaho Vandals men's basketball team represented the University of Idaho during the 2000–01 NCAA Division I men's basketball season. Members of the Big West Conference, the Vandals were led by fourth-year head coach David Farrar and played their home games on campus at the Kibbie Dome in Moscow, Idaho.

They lost the tiebreaker for the final berth in the conference tournament to Cal Poly. Idaho had qualified for the tourney in the previous three seasons, but was the sole team not to participate this year.

The Cowan Spectrum (configuration inside the Kibbie Dome) debuted late in the season with a victory over rival Boise State, which drew a season-high attendance of 5,184 on Saturday, 

Farrar was fired by athletic director Mike Bohn days after the regular season ended; he was succeeded by alumnus Leonard Perry, an assistant at Iowa State, regular season champions of the Big 12 Conference.

References

External links
Sports Reference – Idaho Vandals: 2000–01 basketball season
Gem of the Mountains: 2001 University of Idaho yearbook – 2000–01 basketball season
Idaho Argonaut – student newspaper – 2001 editions

Idaho Vandals men's basketball seasons
Idaho
Idaho Vandals men's basketball team
Idaho Vandals men's basketball team